This is a list of noted Indian police officers.

 * refers to the current rank of the police officer

See also
 Indian Police Service

References

Lists of police officers